Bill "Wee Willie" Webber (June 11, 1929 – May 23, 2010) was an American radio and television personality and pioneer. Webber worked in radio and television in the Philadelphia, Pennsylvania, region for more than 50 years.

Biography
Webber was born in Havana, Cuba. His father was British while his grandfather, an engineer, helped to pave the streets of Havana. His family immigrated to the United States, and Webber was raised in the Bushwick neighborhood of Brooklyn, New York. Webber graduated from Bushwick High School and attended classes at New York University.

Webber enlisted in the United States Army after World War II and worked as an Army mapmaker while stationed in Japan after the war. He successfully auditioned for the Armed Forces Radio on Honshu, earning the nickname "Honshu Cowboy" because he played country music. His time in the Army allowed Webber to obtain U.S. citizenship.

Broadcasting
Webber began his broadcasting career in 1948, at WGYN, a now-defunct FM radio station in New York City. He worked for other radio stations in Manhattan and in Lancaster, Pennsylvania during his early adulthood.

Webber was hired as an announcer at WEEU-TV (channel 33) in Reading, Pennsylvania, in 1953. However, the station was unprofitable; it went off the air in 1955, after Webber left.

In 1954, Webber began working in Philadelphia at WFIL and WFIL-FM as a "summer relief announcer."

In 1956, Webber became an announcer at WFIL-TV (Channel 6). He began hosting Breakfast Time, a two-hour, morning children's show on Channel 6. The show, which featured cartoons, weather, and sports, aired until the 1960s. In 1963, Webber joined WRCV-TV (Channel 3) as host of a quiz show. However, Webber's quiz show was canceled in 1965 when Westinghouse Broadcasting acquired the station and moved production of The Mike Douglas Show to Philadelphia. In September 1965, Webber played the last song on KYW radio before the station switched to an all-news format.

He next hosted the Wee Willie Webber Colorful Cartoon Club, an after-school show which aired on WPHL-TV (Channel 17) in the late afternoon hours. The Wee Willie Webber Colorful Cartoon Club ran for 10 years, from 1965 until 1975. From 1976 to 1979, he hosted a similar show on WKBS-TV (Channel 48).

In the late 1960s, Webber became the 10 a.m. to 1 p.m air personality at WIP radio. He would remain in that time slot on WIP into the 1980s. Webber later was heard on WPEN radio from 1989 until 2005. From about 2007 until 2010, Webber hosted a weekday program on WHAT radio and a Sunday afternoon show on WVLT in Vineland, New Jersey.

Webber was inducted into the Broadcast Pioneers of Philadelphia Hall of Fame in 1999. He served as the president of the Broadcast Pioneers of Philadelphia from 2002 until 2004.  From 2004 until 2006, Webber served as the chairman of the Broadcast Pioneers' board of directors. In 2006, the Broadcast Pioneers of Philadelphia named Webber its Person of the Year. In 2007, Webber again served as the organization's Chairman of the Board, a position that Bill held at the time of his death in 2010.

Death
Bill Webber died of a heart attack at Penn Presbyterian Medical Center in Philadelphia on May 23, 2010, at the age of 80. He was awaiting heart surgery at the time of his death. He was survived by his wife, Constance; daughter, Wendy Scheid; son, William Webber Jr.; and four grandchildren (Taylor, actor Drew Scheid, Owen, and Grace). Webber lived on Rittenhouse Square at the time.

Television

Radio

References

External links
 Broadcast Pioneers of Philadelphia Bio
 The Encyclopedia of Philadelphia Children's Television
 Wee Willie Webber entry in Philadelphia Television book preview
 Wee Willie Webber Photos on PHL17 website
 'Wee Willie' Webber dies, a beloved radio, TV star
 
 
 
 
 
 
 
 
 
 
 
 

American children's television presenters
2010 deaths
Radio personalities from Philadelphia
Mass media in Philadelphia
Television personalities from Philadelphia
People from Havana
People from Bushwick, Brooklyn
1929 births
Local children's television programming in the United States
Television in Philadelphia
Bushwick High School alumni